Shanaya Fastje (born April 13, 1999 in El Paso Texas) is an American author, singer-songwriter, motivational speaker, actress, and Philanthropist.

Early life
Shanaya Fastje is the daughter of Lothar and Connie Fastje. At 12 years old she moved to Los Angeles to further pursue her singing, writing, acting, and speaking career. Shanaya attended various schools until she graduated High School with honors on May 10, 2012 at the age of thirteen. In 2010 and 2011, Shanaya was a member of The Youth Council (for high school students) in El Paso Texas after City Hall granted special permission for her to serve.

Career

Published works
She has written and published five books titled "Mystery School", "Mystery School: Monday Sleepover Disaster", "Mystery School: Crazy Adventures", "Bully in the Mirror", and "Velvet Door Society".  "Bully In The Mirror" is a curriculum style self-help book mainly directed to teens, young adults, and adults.

Public speaking
Shanaya began public speaking at the age of ten, after publishing her first two books. Shanaya has spoken at various schools, orphanages and universities including The University of Southern California (USC), California State University San Bernardino (CSU), La Vern University, and The Queen Mary. She has traveled across the United States, teaching how to build self-confidence and combat bullying.

Television appearances 
She is known for her television appearances such as "The Jeff Probst Show," and “Hit Me Up!".

Awards and recognition 
Shanaya has received: 

 President Obama "President's Volunteer Service Award" in 2011
 Governor Rick Perry "Shining Star of Texas Award" in 2009
 The City of Burbank California's "Austin Cook Award for Outstanding Youth" on May 7, 2013
 Prudential Financial and The National Association of Secondary School Principals "The Spirit of Community Award" in 2011 
 United Way "Appreciation for her National Anti-Bullying Program 'Bully in the Mirror'
 Kohl's Department Stores "Super Star Award" in 2010, 2011 and 2012, Landmark LTD.

 “Extraordinary Book: Mystery School” Award For Excellence from over 3,000 entries in 2008
 My One School Incorporated (Charity) “Super Star Award” in recognition for leadership in promoting literacy globally in 2009.

References

External links
 
 

1999 births
American motivational speakers
Women motivational speakers
American women singer-songwriters
Living people
American women writers
Writers from El Paso, Texas
Musicians from Los Angeles
Writers from Los Angeles
Singer-songwriters from Texas
Singer-songwriters from California
Musicians from El Paso, Texas
21st-century American women singers
21st-century American singers